In Their Boots is a documentary series about the impact the War in Iraq and the War in Afghanistan are having on people at home in the United States. Every episode features a documentary about how the servicemen and women of the American armed forces, their families, and American communities have been changed by the nation's campaigns in Iraq and Afghanistan. The show has covered issues such as the effects of deployment, post-traumatic stress disorder, traumatic brain injury, recovery from physical injury, military widows, partners of gays in the military, homelessness, women in the military, and sexual assault in the military. In 2010, In Their Boots launched Operation In Their Boots, which gave 5 combat veterans the opportunity to produce and direct their own documentaries.

In Their Boots is funded by a grant from the Iraq Afghanistan Deployment Impact Fund (IADIF) of the California Community Foundation and is produced by Brave New Foundation.

Season 2 of In their Boots began airing on PBS stations in July 2010.

List of episodes

References

External links
Official website
Listen to episode on NPR
Operation In Their Boots on NPR (with video)

Documentary web series
Documentary films about the War in Afghanistan (2001–2021)
Documentary films about the Iraq War
2008 American television series debuts
2000s American documentary television series
2010s American documentary television series
American non-fiction web series